Alphonse Léopold Bauduin Six (1 January 1890 – 19 August 1914) was a Belgian football player.

Six was born in Bruges and is mainly remembered for his goal-scoring capacities. In his period with Cercle Brugge he scored 93 times in only 89 matches. His 1910–1911 season was especially remarkable, when scoring 38 goals in 20 matches, half of the goals Cercle Brugge scored that season. In 1910 Six received his first cap for Belgium, winning 3–2 against the Netherlands and scoring once. Six played nine times for Belgium, scoring eight goals.

Six still holds two Cercle Brugge team records:
 An average of 1.045 goals per match.
 Five goals in one match, against R.E. Sport's Club

In 1912, Six left Cercle for Union SG. Due to Union SG not keeping their promises about a job for him - professional footballers were unheard of at that time - he moved to Olympique Lillois, a predecessor of Lille OSC. That season he became the first Belgian football player to become a champion in a foreign country.

Death
In the beginning of August 1914, the Germans invaded Belgium and Six was called to arms. After the fall of the forts in Liège, King Albert I pulled his troops back to Antwerp. During this manoeuvre, the Belgian troops were surrounded by the Germans near Boutersem. Six and his companions were killed on 19 August, only two weeks after war broke out.

Palmares

Club
Cercle
Belgian First Division (1): 1910–11

Union
Belgian First Division (1): 1912–13
Belgian Cup (1): 1912–13

Lille
Trophée de France (1): 1914
Championnat USFSA (1): 1914
Championnat USFSA Nord (1): 1914

References
 Cerclemuseum.be

External links
 

1890 births
1914 deaths
Footballers from Bruges
Belgian footballers
Cercle Brugge K.S.V. players
Association football forwards
Lille OSC players
Belgium international footballers
Belgian Army personnel of World War I
Belgian military personnel killed in World War I
Belgian Pro League players
Belgian expatriate footballers
Expatriate footballers in France
Belgian expatriate sportspeople in France